Cochylimorpha pseudoalternana is a species of moth of the family Tortricidae. It is found in Algeria.

References

Moths described in 1993
Cochylimorpha
Moths of Africa